Sir Samuel Vanacker Sambrooke, 3rd Baronet ( – 27 December 1714) of Bush Hill, Enfield, Middlesex, was a British landowner and politician who sat in the House of Commons as MP for Bramber and Great Bedwyn.

Early life
Sambrooke was born into a wealthy family of merchants, long connected with the East India Company and Madras. He was the eldest son and heir of Sir Jeremy Sambrooke of Bush Hill (d. 1705) and Judith ( Vanacker) Sambrooke. His younger brother was John Sambrooke, MP for Dunwich and Wenlock who married Elizabeth Forester (daughter of Sir William Forester and granddaughter of James Cecil, 3rd Earl of Salisbury). Among his sisters were Catherine Sambrooke (the wife of Sir William Strickland, 4th Baronet, Secretary at War), Hannah Sambrooke (wife of John Gore, MP for Great Grimsby and a son of Sir William Gore).

His maternal grandparents were Susanna ( Butler) Vanacker (a daughter of James Butler of Amberley Castle, Sussex) and Nicholas Vanacker, a merchant who was Lord of the Manor of Erith, Kent. His maternal uncles were Sir Nicholas Vanacker, 1st Baronet and Sir John Vanacker, 2nd Baronet.

Career
Sambrooke was elected to the Parliament of England for Bramber in 1704 in place of John Middleton whose return had been declared void. The following year, however, Sambrooke and William Penn Jr. lost their bid for election to Parliament for Bramber. Penn filed, but later withdrew, a petition charging his opponents with bribery. He was reelected for Great Bedwyn in the Parliament of Great Britain in 1708, serving until 1710. He did not stand again.

In 1711, he succeeded to the baronetcy, and estates, under special remainder on the death of his maternal uncle, Sir John Vanacker, 2nd Baronet.

Personal life
On 21 January 1701, Sambrooke was married to Elizabeth Wright at St Giles in the Fields. She was a daughter of Sir Nathan Wright of Caldecote, Warwickshire, Lord Keeper of the Great Seal under King William III and Queen Anne. Elizabeth's sister, Dorothy Wright, married Henry Grey, 3rd Earl of Stamford. Together, they were the parents of three daughters and one son, including:

 Jane Elizabeth Sambrooke, who married Charles Wake-Jones of Waltham Abbey, Essex, son of Sir Baldwin Wake, 5th Baronet. After his death, she married Sir Humphrey Monoux, 4th Baronet, son of Sir Philip Monoux, 3rd Baronet, in 1742.
 Sir Jeremy Vanacker Sambrooke, 4th Baronet (–1740), MP for Bedford; he died unmarried.
 Susannah Sambrooke (1708–1799), who married John Crawley, MP for Marlborough and son of Richard Crawley.

Sir Samuel died on 27 December 1714 at his home in Chancery Lane. His widow lived until 7 December 1775. He was succeeded in the baronetcy by his son, Jeremy. Upon Jeremy's death in 1740, the baronetcy went to his uncle, Jeremy Sambrooke, the fifth and last baronet.G.E. Cokayne; with Vicary Gibbs, H.A. Doubleday, Geoffrey H. White, Duncan Warrand and Lord Howard de Walden, editors, The Complete Peerage of England, Scotland, Ireland, Great Britain and the United Kingdom, Extant, Extinct or Dormant, new ed., 13 volumes in 14 (1910-1959; reprint in 6 volumes, Gloucester, U.K.: Alan Sutton Publishing, 2000), volume II, page 14.

References

1670s births
1714 deaths
Baronets in the Baronetage of England
Sambrooke, Bt, Sir Samuel
Sambrooke, Bt, Sir Samuel
Sambrooke, Bt, Sir Samuel
Members of Parliament for Great Bedwyn